Gene Hamilton may refer to:

 Gene Hamilton (cyclist), American mountain bike racer and coach
 Gene Hamilton (lawyer), American lawyer and Trump administration official
 Eugene Hamilton, American medical researcher 
Eugene Hamilton (politician), American politician from Mississippi